Cyfri'r Geifr, also known as Oes Gafr Eto after the first line, is a Welsh folk song. Both the tune and the words are traditional, and have developed over the centuries.

Variations and use as a vocal exercise
Most versions of the song are accelerando, with the song beginning slowly and increasing in speed for each new verse. The first four lines are repeated before each new goat is counted, and additional choruses may be included by simply changing the colour in each new verse. A particularly difficult "tongue twister" can be performed by singing each verse twice, doubling the speed the second time through. A pink goat is usually saved for the final verse, as the repeated Voiceless velar plosive at the end of "pinc" is the most difficult to sing at any speed.

For these reasons, the song is often used as a demonstration of the singers skill and is used as both a vocal warm up and a performative showstopper. The song is a popular test-piece in Welsh choral competitions, and has been recorded by many singers and choirs.

Lyrics
Although up to sixteen versions of the song have been identified, mainly regional, this version is the most common.

External links 
Youtube version accompanied by a harp

Welsh folk songs
Year of song unknown
Songwriter unknown